Fernão Dias Pais Leme (1608–1681) or was a frontiersman from São Paulo. He was known as the "Emerald Hunter" and was one of the most prominent bandeirantes together with Antônio Raposo Tavares.

He is the great-great-grandfather of the Saint Frei Galvão.

The Casa Fernão Dias, run by the Sumidouro State Park, is in the Quinta do Sumidouro district of Pedro Leopoldo, Minas Gerais.
It is listed by the State Institute of Historic and Artistic Heritage (IEPHA) as a cultural heritage monument.
The exhibits tell the history of  Fernão Dias, who spent several years in the region with his followers in search of gold and precious stones.

References

Sources

1608 births
1681 deaths
Portuguese explorers of South America